Prior to its uniform adoption of proportional representation in 1999, the United Kingdom used first-past-the-post for the European elections in England, Scotland and Wales. The European Parliament constituencies used under that system were smaller than the later regional constituencies and only had one Member of the European Parliament each.

The constituency of London Central was one of them.

When it was created in England in 1979, it consisted of the Westminster Parliament constituencies of Chelsea, City of London and Westminster South, Fulham, Hammersmith North, Hampstead, Holborn and St Pancras South, Kensington, Paddington, St Marylebone and St Pancras North.

United Kingdom Parliamentary constituencies were redrawn in 1983 and the European constituencies were altered in 1984 to reflect this. The revised seat comprised the following Westminster constituencies: Chelsea, City of London and Westminster South, Fulham, Hampstead and Highgate, Holborn and St Pancras, Islington North, Islington South and Finsbury, Kensington and Westminster North. The same boundaries were used in 1989 and 1994.

Members of the European Parliament

Results

References

External links
 David Boothroyd's United Kingdom Election Results

Central
20th century in London
1979 establishments in England
1999 disestablishments in England
Constituencies established in 1979
Constituencies disestablished in 1999